A SIM box (also called a SIM bank) is device used as part of a VoIP gateway installation. It contains a number of SIM cards, which are linked to the gateway but housed and stored separately from it. A SIM box can have SIM cards of different mobile operators installed, permitting it to operate with several GSM gateways located in different places.

Usage and detection

The SIM box operator can route calls through the VoIP connection and connect the call as local traffic, allowing the box's operator to bypass high international rates and to reduce prices charged by local mobile network operators (MNO). In voice communications, typically a private exchange is used receive traffic from a local area, and the calls are routed over the internet to a SIM box in a remote region.  This business model of operation is commonly used to avoid higher tolls for non-mobile long distance calls, particularly those associated with lesser-developed countries. 

SIM boxes are often used for lower rate VoIP to MNO termination purposes, including avoidance of high tolls in violation of carriers' acceptable use policies and the sending of mobile text messaging spam.

Some carriers attempt to detect and deny service to SIM boxes through various means, including cancellation or restriction of service to identified SIMs. SIM box operators often swap SIMs to replace restricted ones. They may also rewrite the International Mobile Equipment Identity (IMEI) of the SIM box, often using randomized IMEIs in ranges of or those assigned to common mobile phones to evade detection.  

The use of SIM boxes is often legal, but the use may constitute competition of carrier contracts. One example is that of the country of Ghana, where the government use to challenge the use of SIM boxes. In some jurisdictions the common practice of rewriting or omitting an IMEI use to be challenged.

Telecommunications companies have failed to illegalize VoIP simboxes or any type VoIP operations globally, no country has achieved passing a bill or act to ban the use of simboxes and VoIP in general.

Call quality
As the normal mobile network are sometimes using a very outdated and low quality sound codecs (such as the GSM HR and FR codecs), a SIM box may provide local connectivity with superior sound quality.

References

VoIP hardware
Mobile technology